is a member of the Liberal Democratic Party of Japan and a member of the Japanese House of Representatives. He was the secretary for the Ministry of Health, Labour, and Welfare. He thinks that family is the foundation of securing the nation of Japan. He disputes the legitimacy of the International Military Tribunal for the Far East, saying that the tribunal helped place a masochistic view of history in the Japanese people's minds.

References

Liberal Democratic Party (Japan) politicians